Yjnayavalkya Lakshminarayan Vidyapeeth is a Sanskrit–language Nepalese university campus. It is one of the constituent campuses of Nepal Sanskrit University. It was established in 1774 CE (1801 BS) by Hema Karna Sen, the King of Makwanpur and a sage named Tasmaiya Baba in Matihani village of Nepal. It is one of the oldest educational institutions of Nepal and has helped establish Matihani, Mahottari as a centre of Sanskrit and Hindu Vedic education.

Etymology 
The campus is named after the Hindu sage Yajnavalkya and the divine couple Lakshmi Narayana. The campus was established on the premise of a temple dedicated to Lakshmi Narayana. Vidyapeeth loosely translates to an education centre.

History 
In 1744 (1801 BS), King Hema Karna Sen of Makwanpur, built a temple dedicated to Lakshmi Narayana at Matihani and a sage named Tasmaiya Baba started teaching Sanskrit below a Peepul tree located at the temple's premises. From , the institution started teaching Sanskrit grammar, Vedanta, and Ramayana. From , the Mahanth (main priest) of Lakshminarayan, Math Varanasidas and Chhatranath, started teaching Vedas, Nyaya Shastra and Jyotish Shastra.

Programs 
 Uttar Madhyama (Intermediate)
 Shastri (Bachelor's)
 Prakshastri

References 

Universities in Nepal
Buildings and structures in Mahottari District